John Wesley Mitchell,  (16 March 1891 – 29 September 1969) was a soldier of the Australian military serving in both World War I and World War II.

Battle of Vevi
The Battle of Vevi was part of the Greek campaign of World War II. It took place on 11–12 April 1941, north of the town of Amyntaion, close to the northwestern Greek border. Allied troops fought forces from Nazi Germany. Australian official historian Gavin Long: "At 2:00 pm ... Lt.-Col. [John] Mitchell of the 2/8th ... ordered a counter-attack which regained some vital ground on top of the ridge... After six hours of intermittent fighting in the pass and on the slopes to the east, the 2/8th still held the Hills though their left had been mauled; the Rangers, however, were rallying astride the road about two miles to the rear, but five of the six supporting guns of the 2/1st Anti-Tank Regiment had been left without protection and abandoned. Thus the ridge held by the 2/8th formed a deep salient." The 2/8th Battalion was effectively destroyed as a fighting force for the rest of the Greek campaign. According to some accounts, at its fallback position of Rodona, the battalion could muster only 250 men, of whom only 50 had weapons. The 2/8th eventually left Greece with the Allies.

Bibliography 
Notes

References  

1891 births
1969 deaths
Australian Army officers
Australian military personnel of World War I
Australian military personnel of World War II
Companions of the Distinguished Service Order